This page is a collection of AFL Women's games records. The AFL Women's (AFLW) is Australia's national semi-professional women's Australian rules football competition. The following tables only include home-and-away matches and finals; practice matches are excluded from the totals.

Most AFL Women's games

Below are the players who have played at least 50 games at AFLW level.

Updated to the end of S7 (2022).

Club games record holders

Below are the players who hold the record for most games played at their respective clubs.

Updated to the end of S7 (2022).

50-game players for one club

Below are the players who have played at least 50 games for one club. This table only includes foundation AFLW teams, as they are currently the only teams to have played at least 50 games.

See also

 AFL Women's goalkicking records
 VFL/AFL games records

References

Sources
 Every AFLW player at AustralianFootball.com

Lists of AFL Women's players
Australian rules football records and statistics